Produce Co., Ltd. was a Japanese video game company. Founded on April 6, 1990 by former Irem employees, it developed a number of games for both Enix and Hudson Soft. Produce! have created games for arcades and for the Super Nintendo Entertainment System, Nintendo 64, PlayStation, and PC Engine systems.

Games
The 7th Saga
Aldynes: The Mission Code for Rage Crisis
Brain Lord
Dual Heroes
Googootrops
Kaijuu Senki
Kaikan Phrase: Datenshi Kourin
Mystic Ark
Mystic Ark: Theatre of Illusions
Neo Bomberman
Paca Paca Passion
Paca Paca Passion 2
Paca Paca Passion Special
Super Bomberman
Super Bomberman 2
Super Bomberman 4
Super Adventure Island
Tengai Makyou: Dennou Karakuri Kakutouden

References

Japanese companies established in 1990
Japanese companies disestablished in 2015
Video game companies established in 1990
Video game companies disestablished in 2015
Defunct video game companies of Japan